Eric Orlando Quintero Herrera (born 16 February 1992) is a Panamanian footballer who currently plays as a midfielder with Serie D Italian club Sorrento.

Club career
Herrera played for AC Treviso, Parma FC and Hellas Verona youth teams before joining Pordenone. On 7 August 2011, Herrera scored a brace in his Coppa Italia debut for Avellino in a first round match against Portogruaro, leading them to a 3–0 victory.

In June 2012 he signed a new 3-year contract with club. He was loaned to Rimini in January 2014 and after six months at Paganese he moved to Lecce in January 2015.

References

External links

1992 births
Living people
Association football midfielders
Panamanian footballers
Panamanian expatriate footballers
U.S. Avellino 1912 players
Rimini F.C. 1912 players
Paganese Calcio 1926 players
U.S. Lecce players
A.S. Melfi players
Serie B players
Serie C players
Expatriate footballers in Italy